Qualification for shooting at the 2024 Summer Paralympics begins from June 7, 2022. There will be three events for male and female sports shooters and seven mixed events. There will be a total of 160 athlete quotas (45 male, 60 female, 55 gender free).

Timeline 
Detailed direct allocation slots are listed in the qualification slots section.

* Subject to change.

Qualification requirements

Eligibility scores 
Each athlete from each NPC must at least aim to score targets in each medalling event in the qualifying tournaments.

Summary

Qualification slots 

 An NPC may enter a maximum of two (2) eligible athletes per medal event.
 An athlete may only obtain one (1) qualification slot for his/her NPC. An NPC may obtain a maximum of two (2) qualification slots per medal event across all Qualification Competitions. The maximum number of events that an athlete may compete in is three (3).
 An NPC can be allocated a maximum total of twelve (12) qualification slots, with a maximum of eight (8) slots for male athletes or eight (8) slots for female athletes.
 Qualification slots are allocated to the NPCs, not to the individual athlete however in Bipartite Commission Invitation, the slot is allocated to the individual athlete not to the NPC.

Pistol

P1 – Men's 10 m Air Pistol SH1

P2 – Women's 10 m Air Pistol SH1

P3 – Mixed 25 m Pistol SH1

P4 – Mixed 50 m Pistol SH1

Rifle

R1 – Men's 10 m Air Rifle Standing SH1

R2 – Women's 10 m Air Rifle Standing SH1

R3 – Mixed 10 m Air Rifle Prone SH1

R4 – Mixed 10 m Air Rifle Standing SH2

R5 – Mixed 10 m Air Rifle Prone SH2

R6 – Mixed 50 m Rifle Prone SH1

R7 – Men's 50 m Rifle 3 Positions

R8 – Women's 50 m Rifle 3 Positions

R9 – Mixed 50 m Rifle Prone SH2

Notes 
 There is only one female athlete who has qualified
 No female athlete who has qualified

References 

2024 Summer Paralympics
Summer Paralympic Games
International sports competitions hosted by Paris
2020s in Paris
2024 in disability sport